Pandora is Taiwanese Mandopop artist Angela Chang's third Mandarin studio album. It was released on 1 January 2006 by Linfair Records. The Pandora (Bump Off Lover Edition) was released on 24 February 2006 with a bonus DVD containing seven music videos and Taiwanese drama Bump Off Lover sneak peeks.

The track "潘朵拉" (Pandora) was nominated for Top 10 Gold Songs at the Hong Kong TVB8 Awards, presented by television station TVB8, in 2006.

The track, "隱形的翅膀" (Invisible Wings) won one of the Top 10 Songs of the Year, at the 2007 HITO Radio Music Awards presented by Taiwanese radio station Hit FM. It is the fifth best selling album in Taiwan with 88,000 copies sold in 2006.

Track listing
 "隱形的翅膀" (Invisible Wings)
 "潘朵拉" (Pandora)
 "香水百合" (Water Lily)
 "真的" (Really)
 "最近" (Recent)
 "驚天動地" (Shaken World)
 "保護色" (Protective Color)
 "口袋的天空" (Pocket's Sky)
 "愛情旅程" (Love Journey)
 "喜歡你沒道理" (Like You without Reason)
 "永晝" (Day Time Forever)

Bonus DVD
Pandora (Bump Off Lover Edition)
 "潘朵拉" (Pandora) MV
 "隱形的翅膀" (Invisible Wings) MV
 "真的" (Really) MV
 "喜歡你沒道理" (Like You without Reason) MV
 "香水百合" (Water Lily) MV
 "口袋的天空" (Pocket's Sky) MV
 "保護色" (Protective Color) MV
 Bump Off Lover sneak peeks

References

External links
  Angela Chang discography@Linfair Records

2006 albums
Angela Chang albums